is a fictional character in Capcom's Street Fighter video game series. The first ever female playable character to appear in a fighting game to gain mainstream recognition, she first appeared in Street Fighter II: The World Warrior in 1991. In the series, she is an expert martial artist and Interpol officer who restlessly seeks revenge for the death of her father at the hands of the evil M. Bison, leader of the Shadaloo crime syndicate.

Since her debut, Chun-Li has become a mainstay of the franchise and one of its most popular figures. She has appeared in nearly all subsequent installments of the series and several Capcom spinoff games. She is also featured prominently in Street Fighter-related media, including two feature films, multiple anime and comic book productions, and other official series merchandise. She has earned much positive fan and critical reception for factors such as her backstory, athleticism and in-game playability, and she is considered a trailblazer for female characters in fighting titles and general video gaming.

Development history

Design

Chun Li's design was primarily inspired by Tong Pooh, a female villain from Strider, an earlier Capcom game. Capcom designer Akira Nishitani said on recounting the creation of the character: "Previously there were no women in fighting games". In Chun-Li's case said Nishitani, I wanted a woman in the game. I determined what her fighting abilities would be. Then China just came up as a possible homeland." Capcom artist and designer Akira "Akiman" Yasuda said the initial inspiration for Chun-Li came from the 1983 anime film Harmagedon: Genma Wars (featuring early character design work by Akira creator Katsuhiro Otomo), which had a Chinese female character called Tao. Chun-Li was originally known as just 'Chinese Girl' among the development team. She had a backflip attack that was popular among testers but deemed too strong, and unfortunately had to be cut from the game after they ran out of time. Her name means 'beautiful spring' in Chinese as 麗. Chūn (春) means 'spring', and lì (麗) means 'beautiful' in Mandarin dialects.

Yasuda recalled they only had five weeks to make Chun-Li in the game and he was deeply worried about the quality of her design and how she would be received. Chun-Li "was wearing pants right up until the very end [of the development]. When we made the sprites I thought she didn't look right, so I had them changed to tights instead." Akiman added that they "wanted Street Fighter II to be more entertaining than its predecessor. That also helps explain how Chun-Li came to be. Having a female character in the game completely changes the game's dynamic, she brightens up the entire palette. We needed a reason for her to fight, and so an evil empire [of M. Bison] came to mind." He also said: "To be honest, I spent some time worrying about putting Chun-Li, the heroine, into such a plain setting. Ordinarily, you don't see women participating in global martial arts tournaments. Just by adding her we were starting to push things to the 'fun' side. I didn't think about it at the time, but thinking about it now, from the moment we put Chun-Li into the game we were already pushing things towards the full-on entertainment side."

Chun-Li was designed with an exceptionally strong physique because she was the sole woman among a roster of powerful male characters in Street Fighter II. To overcome this perceived imbalance, she was devised as a character who had mastered Chinese kenpo and really pushed her body to the limit so that she could compete with such a cast of large and imposing men. She was nevertheless the fastest but physically weakest character in her first game. Capcom producer Yoshiki Okamoto said he wanted to also make the life bar for Chun-Li "shorter than for the other characters because women are not as strong. But Nishitani didn't want to do that. We both had legitimate reasons, but then we came to an agreement to not make it shorter."

Chun-Li is particularly well known for her very muscular legs, while depictions of the rest of her body are more variable. According to Capcom composer Yoko Shimomura, Chun-Li's big thighs originated from Akiman's personal fetish. The size of Chun-Li's thighs massively increased in Street Fighter III. Capcom producer Yoshinori Ono commented on the issue. "I witnessed as her thighs made a sudden jump into gigantism in SFIII. When we first put her in the game, her sprite was just an outline and her thighs weren't that big...but as the artists starting coloring her in, her legs got thicker and thicker." However, they all felt the larger legs increased the expressiveness of her animations. Regarding then-upcoming Street Fighter IV, Ono said the "character designer, [Daigo] Ikeno, is kind of into thick girls, so as an artist he feels that the most beautiful thighs he can give Chun-Li would be of the wide variety."

Chun-Li sprite's panty-flashing animation frames have been censored for the home console releases by Nintendo. In response to fans that were disappointed with Chun-Li's absence from Street Fighter III, Capcom added her to the 3rd Strike version of the game. Since her main designer, Akiman, was busy with other assignments she was redesigned by other members from the staff, taking the most time and effort out of all characters. Her inclusion into Street Fighter EX was deemed natural by the studio Arika, with producer Ichiro Mihara describing her as one of the three essential Street Fighter characters along with Ryu and Ken.

In the Street Fighter Alpha games, where she was redesigned by Eri "Erichan" Nakamura, Chun-Li wears a sleeveless tight outfit, her arms and upper body were visibly much stronger than those of any other female character in the franchise, however many artists choose to depict her as petite and slim, in official and unofficial artworks alike, drawing only her legs strong due to her emphasis on kicking moves. An early version of Chun-Li in Street Fighter IV was reworked following complaints from location tests that she was not "cute". Ono later announced Chun-Li's controversial face in Marvel vs. Capcom: Infinite would be also corrected based on a negative feedback from the fans.

Costumes
In the Street Fighter II sub-series and most of her later appearances, Chun-Li wears a usually blue qipao, an early-20th-century Chinese dress, with golden accents, puffy sleeves, and a white waistband. The dress is modified to allow a far wider range of movement than a generic qipao. In Street Fighter II: The World Warrior, Chun-Li was originally depicted wearing a red qipao instead of blue. It can be also either red or white within some games since Street Fighter II: Champion Edition and Street Fighter II: Hyper Fighting, respectively. In Marvel vs. Capcom: Infinite, the qipao has a very noticeable silky sheen. Her other ensemble includes a pair of white combat boots and brown tights. She usually wears her hair in "ox horns", with silk brocades and ribbons in her hair. Another iconic part of her design are the large spiked bracelets she wears on her wrists.

In the Street Fighter Alpha games (set during the time period before Street Fighter II), Chun-Li wears a Chinese acrobatic outfit consisting of an embroidered vest, a unitard, and sneakers; she is wearing her ox horns unadorned, but kept in place with yellow ribbons. In Street Fighter IV, Chun-Li's alternate outfit consists of black tabard with gold accents at the bottom, while her ox horns are unadorned, just like in her Alpha appearance, only this time it is held by red ropes with golden balls at the tip. This outfit is completed with red shoes, gold earrings and black and gold bracelets. Her alternative wardrobe in Super Street Fighter IV includes a costume inspired by Mai Shiranui and in Street Fighter V she has a Halloween downloadable content (DLC) appearing as Morrigan Aensland. She has by far most costumes out of all characters in Street Fighter V (a total of 17 by 2018), including some with different hairstyles.

Gameplay
Chun-Li's gameplay style changes notably from game to game, with for example Champion Edition restoring her flipping attacks that have been removed from the original version of Street Fighter II. Street Fighter III: 3rd Strike marked a strong departure from previous incarnations as it featured a large number of revamped moves. Later games have looked to balance between her Street Fighter II and 3rd Strike styles.

Chun-Li started as a weak and fast close-range fighter compared to the bigger male characters from Street Fighter II with the best aerial ability in the game, but she steadily gained an array of different moves through the games, such as a projectile attack or an anti-air defensive move, which steered her towards a more balanced type with an emphasis on poking and control of neutral game thanks to a rich set of non-special moves of relatively long range. She has been noted to be one of the most powerful characters in the game, alongside Ken and Yun.

Street Fighter Alpha 2 and Alpha 3 feature Chun-Li's original outfit from Street Fighter II as an alternate version of the character with alternate special abilities and Super Combos. CVG opined she was "the most-improved character in Alpha 2, and possibly the #1 character in the whole game."

She was considerably weakened in Street Fighter EX, but has remained one of the fastest characters. The development team for Street Fighter EX attempted to bring Chun-Li back to her roots as an agility-oriented character by, among other things, restoring her Spinning Bird Kick and removing the fireball attack she acquired in Street Fighter II Turbo as they felt the projectile attack had too radically altered her originally agile fighting style.

Her appearances in the Marvel vs. Capcom series are reminiscent of her early gameplay, featuring her as one of the fastest characters in the games, taking advantage of the faster gameplay of the games as well as game mechanics such as multiple jumps and air dashes; her X-Factor power-up in Marvel vs. Capcom 3 features an increment in speed. Chun-Li's normal moves are balanced among punches and kicks, but most of her special moves are kicks. Her most recognizable special moves remain the Hyakuretsu Kyaku, a series of quick kicks from a one-legged stance (usually referred to as Lightning Legs/Kicks in English), and the Spinning Bird Kick, where she spins while upside down in a front split kicking all around her. Chun-Li can also use the Kiko-Ken, a ranged energy projectile similar to Ryu's Hadouken, and a concentrated static energy burst known as the Kiko-Sho.

Appearances

Video games

Street Fighter

Chun-Li, canonically born on March 1, 1968, is an expert martial arts practitioner. She started training in several styles of Chinese kempo ("Chinese martial arts") at the age of five, especially tai chi chuan, which she would later complement with sanda (combat wushu) and fighting styles from all around the world, such as taekwondo, full contact karate, judo and capoeira. Related to her police job, she is a very skilled firearm user, her game profiles stating that she has at least once achieved a sixth place in an international shooting competition. She has been noted in-universe for her fluent English, investigating skills, penetrating eyes, beauty and acting talent for deception. Chun-Li is presented as a woman with a strong sense of justice, and her motives for fighting crime range from avenging the death of her father to protecting innocents. She especially cares for kids, showing repulse for the use of brainwashed young girls in Street Fighter Alpha 3 and the kidnap of a girl in Street Fighter III: 3rd Strike. In the latter game, she decides she will teach her fighting style and philosophy to children.

Chun-Li was introduced in 1991 in the original version of Street Fighter II (Street Fighter II: The World Warrior) as the franchise's first playable female character, an undercover Interpol agent seeking to avenge the death of her father at the hands of M. Bison and his criminal organization. Upon Bison's defeat, she fulfills her revenge and decides to return to her life as an ordinary girl; Super Street Fighter II allows players to choose this ending or another in which she remains a police officer. The Street Fighter Alpha prequel series built upon her backstory, while Street Fighter III: 3rd Strike shows her retired and teaching martial arts to young children, only to be forced to return to law enforcement after one of her students is abducted by Urien. Chun-Li returns in Street Fighter IV, where her in-game narrative shows her at crossroads in her life, eventually returning to both street fighting and law enforcement. She returns in Street Fighter V; in her prologue story, Chun-Li recalls how she learned of her father's death. In non-canonical spin-off series Street Fighter EX, Chun-Li is a police officer investigating Shadaloo in search of her missing father.

Other games
Besides the core Street Fighter series, Chun-Li has also made appearances in many other Capcom-produced fighting games, including all titles of the long-running series Marvel vs. Capcom (ever since X-Men vs. Street Fighter, including Shadow Lady, a dark version of Chun-Li that underwent harsh experiments on Bison's orders and was transformed into a brainwashed cyborg) and Capcom vs. SNK (as a rival to SNK character Mai Shiranui), and in Tatsunoko vs. Capcom: Ultimate All-Stars and Street Fighter X Tekken. She and Ryu are the only Street Fighter characters to appear in every Capcom crossover title, including the SNK vs. Capcom fighting game series by SNK and the tactical role-playing games Namco × Capcom, Project X Zone and Project X Zone 2 by Namco (where Chun-Li is paired into a single unit with Morrigan Aensland from Darkstalkers), as well as appearing as a boss in the platform game Street Fighter X Mega Man. She was also planned to appear as a giant robot in Cyberbots. Often, Chun-Li either continues her existing story from Street Fighter II or seeks to arrest the other characters in the game that she sees as suspicious.

Chun-Li is additionally playable in other Capcom games such as versus puzzle games Super Puzzle Fighter II Turbo, Super Gem Fighter Mini Mix (where she can turn into Jill Valentine) and Street Fighter: Puzzle Spirits, and social games Capcom All-Stars and Street Fighter Battle Combination. She has made guest appearances in a number of mobile games, including #Compass, Destiny Child, Granblue Fantasy, Power Rangers: Legacy Wars, and Valkyrie Connect. She makes cameo appearances in various Capcom games including Asura's Wrath, Breath of Fire, Final Fight 2, Mega Man 9, and We Love Golf!. Furthermore, her costumes can be worn by player characters in Capcom's Breath of Fire 6, Dead Rising 3 (a DLC costume for Frank West), Monster Hunter: World, Monster Hunter Explore, and Onimusha: Dawn of Dreams (as an alternate costume for Ohatsu), as well as in Square Enix's Gunslinger Stratos 2 (a costume for Mika Katagiri) and Sony's LittleBigPlanet (a DLC for Sackgirl). A playable Chun-Li character skin has also been added to Fortnite. Chun-Li, under the name "Blue Phoenix Ranger", appears as a playable character in Power Rangers: Battle for the Grid via downloadable content.

Other appearances

Live-action

Chun-Li was a central character in the 1994 Street Fighter film, played by Ming-Na Wen. Chun-Li was given a surname ("Zang Chun-Li") and posed as a television reporter working in Shadaloo in her personal quest to track down and kill Bison, who had murdered her father during a peasant uprising. Her relationship with Guile is acrimonious from the start, as he bluntly rejects her interview request and chides Chun-Li for his own inability to trace a signal broadcast by Bison. Chun-Li allies herself with E. Honda and Balrog, who work as her news crew and whose reputations were ruined by Bison's mafia connections, and later forms an initially uneasy alliance with Ryu and Ken working with Guile in attempting to locate Bison's secret fortress. After Guile's fake death during a staged prison break, Chun-Li uses a homing device to trace him to, and then infiltrate, the Allied Nations' headquarters, where she is shocked to discover that he is still alive. However, Guile does not want her vendetta against Bison interfering with his own. He orders Cammy and T. Hawk to take Chun-Li into custody, but she manages to escape. With Balrog and Honda, all posing as traveling carnival performers, she works with Ken and Ryu on a failed assassination attempt against Bison and Sagat before they are all captured and taken to Bison's fortress. Chun-Li is held prisoner in Bison's private chambers (in an approximation to her traditional game costume), and after she relays the story of her father's murder, Bison mocks her and her fighting skills in response, which provokes Chun-Li into attacking him, having planned all along for an opportunity to personally attack Bison. She actually gains the upper hand before becoming distracted by her comrades coming to her rescue, allowing Bison to escape before subduing them with knock-out gas and taking them hostage. When Guile and the Allied Nations launch an invasion on Bison's fortress during the film's climax, she and the rest of Bison's hostages are freed, and after Bison's forces are defeated, Guile promises her an exclusive interview, but only, he adds in jest, if she shows up in her costume.

As the titular character in the 2009 film Street Fighter: The Legend of Chun-Li, she was played by Kristin Kreuk, her last name was changed to "Xiang" as well as being a pianist turned fighter. Her father was named Huang Xiang and was a businessman Bison abducts and forces to work for him. While she was depicted as Chinese-American, her goal of avenging her father remained unchanged and she succeeds killing Bison with help from her mentor Gen and Charlie Nash. The film was released in Japanese theaters as a double bill with a Studio 4°C-produced anime short that starred fellow Street Fighter character Sakura Kasugano and played after the movie.

Chun-Li was played by a cross-dressing Jackie Chan in the 1993 live-action adaptation of City Hunter during the Street Fighter II spoof scene that positively surprised the original manga's author Tsukasa Hojo. Chun-Li appears in the second season of Street Fighter: Assassin's Fist titled Street Fighter: World Warrior in a significant role. In addition, she also makes cameo appearances in the 2008 Korean film My Mighty Princess (on a poster) and in the 2018 film Ready Player One.

Gemma Nguyen portrays Chun-Li in the official crossover between the Power Rangers and Street Fighter titled Power Rangers: Legacy Wars—Street Fighter Showdown. In the short, Ryu morphs into the RyuRanger and Chun-Li teams with Tommy Oliver, Ninjor and Gia Moran to battle M. Bison and evil Power Rangers.

Nguyen reprised her role in the fan film Street Fighter: Enter the Dragon, intervening in the fight between Fei Long and Balrog near the end.

Animation
Chun-Li is a central character in the 1994 anime film Street Fighter II: The Animated Movie, voiced by Miki Fujitani in the original Japanese version and by Lia Sargent (credited as Mary Briscoe) in the English dub. She is investigating M. Bison's Shadowlaw organization suspected of murdering several diplomats and requests to work with Guile; he initially balks at this as he wants to pursue Bison himself, but later they become inseparable. In a famous instance of fan service, an explicit scene showed Chun-Li showering in her apartment as a Shadowlaw assassin, Vega, arrives to kill her. The shower scene has been censored to varying degrees in versions of the English dub. After a brutal fight, Vega is kicked through a wall and sent plummeting several stories to the ground, but Chun-Li succumbs to her injuries and slips into a coma. She remains hospitalized for the rest of the movie, as a distraught Guile promises her that he will make Bison pay. After Bison is defeated by Ryu and Ken, Chun-Li pulls a prank on Guile by making it appear as if she has died while he was away.

Chun-Li is a regular character in the 1996 American animated series Street Fighter, voiced by Donna Yamamoto. The character reprises her film role as a reporter while she again seeks to avenge her father's death at the hands of Bison, which is shown in flashback in the second episode, "The Strongest Woman in the World".

In the 1997–1998 anime series Street Fighter II V, Chun-Li is voiced by Chisa Yokoyama in the original Japanese version, while Lia Sargent reprises her role in the English dub. Chun-Li is introduced as the 15-year-old daughter of Inspector Do-Rai, a Hong Kong police chief who has schooled her in the martial arts. While attempting to bring down a drug smuggling operation in the country, she works with Interpol to investigate a mysterious organization known as Shadowlaw. Chun-Li serves as the tour guide for Ryu and Ken when they pay a visit to work on their training; Ken is smitten with her and later buys her lavish gifts, including an engagement ring. Despite being underage, they enter a club in a dangerous part of town that hosts an underground fighting ring so Ryu and Ken can prove themselves as street fighters. After Ryu soundly defeats several opponents, the trio are marked for death by the ringleader as a result, and while on the run they encounter and battle various street gangs before being rescued by Chun-Li's father. Traveling with Ryu and Ken to Spain, Chun-Li is stalked by an obsessive Vega, who presents her with a severed bull's ear, intercepts her outside her hotel, sneaks into her room to kiss her while sleeping, then invites her to a masquerade ball that is actually a setup to get Ken to fight him in a cage match. The whole time, Chun-Li is under the influence of Vega's love potion, but it wears off when Vega is defeated. Bison then accosts Chun-Li and she realizes that he is the leader of Shadowlaw, who, unbeknownst to her, had also hired Cammy to garrote Chun-Li's father, an attack he barely survives. Chun-Li plays her largest role in the five-part finale, when she and Ryu are kidnapped and brainwashed by Bison via cyberchip embedded in their foreheads and like in the 1994 American film, she acquires her signature outfit while under Bison's captivity. The chip puts her into an overly aggressive state, which she displays by snapping an opponent's neck in combat, and she later manages to overpower Guile in battle before Ryu and Ken, during their victorious final fight against Bison, succeed in destroying the equipment triggering the chips (in addition to reducing the Shadowlaw base to ruins), returning Chun-Li to normal.

Chun-Li appears in the 1999 anime OVA Street Fighter Alpha: The Animation, voiced by Yumi Tōma in the original Japanese version and again by Lia Sargent in the English dub. There, she is as an Interpol agent who investigates a mad scientist called Sadler who works for Shadaloo. She believes the trail can lead her to her father, who at the time, was missing and presumed alive. She assists Ryu and Ken in finding a kidnapped boy named Shun who claims to be Ryu's younger brother. While tracking Sadler, she accompanies Ryu to where Akuma lives and witnesses as Ryu is almost overcome by the Dark Hadou. She accompanies Ryu, Ken, Birdie, Dan, Guy, Dhalsim, Sodom and Rolento to Sadler's hideout, where she sneaks into the facility with Ryu and Ken. She and Ken rescue the other fighters and end up in a tussle with Sadler's android enforcer, Rosanov, who beats them severely. Ryu ultimately manages to destroy both Rosanov and Sadler, though Shun dies in the process after making peace with Ryu. In the aftermath, Chun-Li returns to Interpol

In the season 6 (2010) Halloween special of the cartoon series American Dad!, Toshi's little sister Akiko goes trick-or-treating as Chun-Li. Chun-Li made cameo appearances in the animated films Wreck-It Ralph and Ralph Breaks the Internet alongside several fellow Street Fighter characters.

Comics
In Malibu Comics' short-lived Street Fighter series, Chun-Li is depicted as having known Ryu and Ken since her late teens, as well as having a romantic interest in Ryu, though both make their first appearances therein fighting each other after he sneaks up on her from behind. She criticizes his overly devout dedication to his training that has seen him distance himself from Ken for a long time, while he tires of hearing her desire of revenge against Bison and is aghast at her announcement that she has started working with Interpol. The main storyline did not focus on Chun-Li nor Ryu, but rather the aftermath of Sagat's murder of Ken, which itself was never resolved as the comic was canceled at Capcom's request after only three issues. Chun-Li is also one of several Street Fighter characters featured in Archie Comics' Worlds Unite event, which saw several Capcom and Sega franchises crossover in the Sonic the Hedgehog, Sonic Universe, Mega Man, and Sonic Boom comic lines.

Promotion and merchandise

There have been multiple Chun-Li lookalike contests in Japan, United States and elsewhere during the early 1990s, with valuable main prizes such as the Nissan 300ZX or the Honda CR-X. Later such contests have been performed on a much smaller scale. Chun-Li's character was used to promote the film Ready Player One in Japan. In 2018, Japanese company Onitsuka Tiger collaborated with Capcom for Chun-Li to wear their new Mexico 66 SD line of sports shoes, and the 30th anniversary of Street Fighter collaboration between Capcom and Japan's Saga Prefecture featured singer and actress Kayo Noro dressed as Chun-Li. Previously, actress Miki Mizuno also dressed as Chun-Li in another promotional event as did pop singer Maki Miyamae to perform Chun-Li's official song on the television. In 1997, actress and pop star Rie Tomosaka played Chun-Li on television as well.

A wide variety of Chun-Li figures have been produced by various manufacturers, including by Capcom itself, Ace Novelty, BigBoysToys, Funko, Kotobukiya, Pop Culture Shock Collectibles, S.H. Figuart, SOTA Toys, Storm Collectibles, Takara Tomy, and Tsume-Art, among many others. Artworks of her were also featured on an officially licensed animated Nubytech/UDON joypad for the PlayStation 2, and a Mad Catz wireless joypad for the PlayStation 3 and Xbox 360. Other assorted merchandise included Diesel sneakers, women's lingerie, a figure-style flash drive USB stick, a postage stamp from Japanese Philatelic Association came with its own collectible figure, and a figurine that came with a DyDo drink. There are also Chun-Li themed pachinko slot games, including Chun-Li Ni Makase China!, the first game of any kind that featured her in a starring role.

Cultural impact

Many fighting game characters from the 1990s that have been directly inspired by Chun-Li in terms of both graphics and gameplay include Li Xiang Fei in Real Bout Fatal Fury 2: The Newcomers, Liu Feilin in Fighter's History, and Sekka in Double Dragon V: The Shadow Falls. Similarities with Chun-Li were further observed in various other characters, such as the move sets of Jamm in Golden Axe: The Duel and Miyabi in Raging Fighter, or the looks of Mei Mei in unreleased Mission: Deadly Skies. Her success furthermore directly contributed to the creation of such characters (besides Street Fighter's own Cammy) as Mai Shiranui or Mortal Kombat's Sonya Blade, followed by Kitana and Mileena; popular fighting characters that resemble Chun-Li include Lei Fang (Dead or Alive), Ling Xiaoyu (Tekken), and Pai Chan (Virtua Fighter).  In the 1992 Hong-Kong film Super Lady Cop, Cynthia Khan's character Ling is nicknamed "Chun Li" in an inspired role, including using some of Chun-Li's moves.

Chun-Li's popularity in China might have influenced Chinese fashion.

Others who have dressed as Chun-Li have included Japanese gravure idols Akina Minami, Erina Kamiya, Yuka Kuramochi and Yuri Morishita, Italian model Francesca Dani, Japanese model Haruna Anno, Korean MMA fighter Jenny Huang, Russian bodybuilder Julia Vins, Japanese model and media personality Kayo Satoh, Japanese singer and model Kyary Pamyu Pamyu, American actress Ming-Na Wen (aside from having portrayed the character in the 1994 film), former Japanese muscle idol Reika Saiki, Chinese doctor and bodybuilder Yuan Herong, Chengxiao from the Korean-Chinese idol group Cosmic Girls, and Turkish media personality Aşkım İrem Aktulga who was transformed into Chun-Li in the show Red Bull Shape Shifters. Some of them have been also male, such as Japanese wrestler Hiroshi Tanahashi or Australian stunt actor and wrestler Ladybeard.

In 2018, rapper Nicki Minaj released a single called “Chun-Li.” British band Arctic Monkeys released an instrumental titled "Chun Li Flying Bird Kick" as a B-side on their 2005 single I Bet You Look Good on the Dancefloor.

Reception

Chun-Li is widely regarded as one of the most popular characters in the series. As she is the first playable female fighting game character she has been dubbed as the "first lady of Fighting games", the "original videogame super-babe", and such. During the 1990s, GamePro chose her as the most iconic character of Street Fighter II and years later called her "everyone's favorite feminine fighter". Mean Machines Sega noted her being "a firm favourite among Street Fighter II fans" and Saturn Power described her as "subject of childish giggles as computer journalists everywhere try as they might to grab a screenshot of her showing her knickers". Her return in Street Fighter III: Third Strike has been called as the main and best addition to the game by IGN and GamePro; Virgin's head of distribution Peter Jones chose the "saucy, sexy, dangerous and fast" as definitely the best character of the game. Retrospectively, Xbox 360 Official Magazine – Australia used her and Samus Aran as examples of gaming's original sex symbols prior to the advent of Lara Croft and Chilango wrote of her, Lara and Mai Shiranui as the video game women "about whom we fantasied in the 90s" and described Mai as "SNK's response to the overwhelming success of Chun-Li."

In 2002, Chun-Li was voted number one in Capcom's own poll of top 85 characters for the 15th anniversary of Street Fighter. She was also ranked third in IGN's 2009 list of top Street Fighter characters, who commented: "Chun-Li's come a long way over the years. She's by far the most popular female fighting game character out there, and if you try to start naming off better-known women in videogaming period, you're going to wind up with a pretty short list." GameDaily ranked her as number one on their 2009 list of top Street Fighter characters of all time, praising her character evolution and for balanced gameplay, as well as second in their 2008 list of top Capcom characters of all time and as the favorite character from the Street Fighter series. UGO ranked her as third on their 2010 list of top Street Fighter characters, adding that as "the first female fighting game character", Chun-Li "was one of few female characters in the early '90s not cast in a role of damsel in distress, but instead showed that female characters could fight just as same as their male counterparts". In 2015, Digital Spy placed her second on their list of top Street Fighter characters, noting that she has "become one of gaming's most famous women alongside the likes of Lara Croft". In a 2018 worldwide poll by Capcom, Chun-Li was voted sixth most popular Street Fighter character. Reporting on this, IGN Japan ranked her third.

Chun-Li's male fans have included the rapper Kid Ink. She has been also highly popular and acclaimed among women gamers, such as Codemasters manager Laura Peterson, model Ursula Mayes, and media personality Violet Berlin; Yuka Kuramochi, who chose Chun-Li as the most ideally erotic body due to her muscular thighs. The creation of Street Fighter II: Champion Edition was in fact inspired by an argument between two girls over which one of them would play as Chun-Li, which was witnessed by Capcom USA's Jeff Walker who then asked Capcom's founder Kenzo Tsujimoto to make a version allowing both players to play the same character. According to the Smithsonian Museum's Chris Mellisinos, Chun-Li "was such an anomaly. How many times did you have the chance to play as a strong female character in arcades? She was drawn attractively, just like Ken and Ryu, but in no way was she a diminished character because she was female." Video game scholar Jennifer deWinter felt it was furthermore very "interesting and surprising to have such a strong Chinese character in Chun-Li coming out of a Japanese game." Nevertheless, PSM noted by 1997 how "a vocal minority believes that [gaming's] female characters do very little to attract women. These people argue that Chun Li, Lara Croft, and most other female game characters are designed primarily for a male gamer's satisfaction, and not geared towards the needs of women garners at all."

Chun-Li has appeared in many top list type articles for the fighting game genre, all video games, and in even in general fiction, often due to her attractiveness. She was awarded the title of the "Hottest Babe of 1992" by Electronic Gaming Monthly, tying with Blaze from Streets of Rage. Chun-Li's cameo in the role-playing game Breath of Fire was included in Expert Gamers 1998 list of the greatest video game secrets. This "feminine, agile, strong, and above all beautiful fighter" was chosen as one of the "muses" of video games by Brazilian magazine SuperGamePower in 2001 and as one of ten "great women of gaming" by GMR in 2004. UGO placed her as ninth on their 2007 list of top "videogame hotties", commenting that "Chun-Li's female presence and early dominance of the fighting game genre propelled her into the minds of many early fanboys." In 2008, Chip ranked Chun-Li as the fifth-top "girl of gaming" and GameDaily ranked her as fourth among the "hottest game babes". In Game Informers 2009 list of top ten best fighting game characters Chun-Li was seventh. In 2010, CraveOnline listed her as one of top ten "hottest girls in gaming", noting that "for millions of early-generation gamers, Capcom's arcade release of Street Fighter II was the very first real taste of a video-game crush." Similarly, Videogamer.com included her in the 2010 list of top ten "video game crushes", noting that gamers have loved her since 1992. Complex ranked her naked appearance in Street Fighter II: The Animated Movie as seventh on the list of the "hottest cartoon women" of all time in 2011, and Complex ranked her as the second-best Asian character in video games in 2012, commenting, "Easily one of the most recognizable characters in video games as a whole, Chun-Li seems to pop up in every list you can think of." That same year, MSN Malaysia included her among the "hottest women in video game history", while UGO including her in their list of "hottest fictional women" of 2012. In 2013, Complex placed her at their top of list of video game characters that deserve a spin-off, noting her as "arguably the most popular female video character ever created." They also ranked her as the "22nd-most-badass" video game character of all time, as well as the seventh-greatest heroine in video game history, calling her "probably the most iconic fighting game character ever." That same year, she was listed as the "second-sexiest female video game character of all time" by AMOG, who stated that "after all these years, Chun-Li remains one of the most classic video game beauties", and as the seventh-sexiest female video game character by Scarlet Clearwater of Soletron, while Steve Jenkins of CheatCodes.com declared her the 13th-hottest video game girl of all time. In 2015, Chun-Li was ranked as second-most-sexy Oriental woman character in games by Indonesian television Liputan 6 and as the 13th-sexiest female video game character by Vietnamese daily Thanh Niên. Game Revolution ranked her as the top female character in 2017, noting her popularity among cosplayers. Suriel Vasquez from Game Informer included her among top ten fighting game characters in 2017 as "one of the most enduring aesthetic designs in a fighter (...) without veering too far into anything too eye-rolling or offensive." Retrospectively, Japanese magazine Famitsu and IGN Spain both put her among the best classic female game heroines from the 1990s, including as the first non-Final Fantasy character on the Famitsu list.

Spike featured Chun-Li in their 2008 contest "Top 10 Video Game Vixens" at number four, citing a preference for her thighs. Ranking her as the second-most-memorable female video games character in 2009, Polish magazine NEO Plus noted her for the most famous thighs in gaming as well as her being a cult figure in Japan and perhaps the most recognizable Street Fighter character in the West. PlayStation Official Magazine – Australia included that "grandmother of all rectum-booting XX chromosomers" among the top five "kick-arse PS3 gals" in 2009 and Mania Entertainment put her second in their 2010 list of "video game women that kick ass". Ranking her as number one on their 2011 list of fighting games' finest female fighters, UGO added, "For the record: There's nothing wrong with Chun-Li's thighs, and they are definitely not 'too big'." Complex ranked her as the "ninth-most dominant" fighting game character in 2012, adding that "Chun-Li and her infamous thighs are instantly recognizable", and also pitted her against SNK's busty ninja icon Mai Shiranui in their 2012 "battle of the beauties" feature, commenting: "Breasts or legs? Personally, we'll take 'em both." GamesRadar put this "first lady of fighters (as in, literally the first one ever)" at 85th place in their 2012 list of the "most memorable, influential, and badass" protagonist in games, calling her "as one of the most recognizable heroines in gaming" praising her for "her combat prowess and positive attitude" and also for "her muscular thunder thighs." In 2013, Entertainment Weeklys Darren Franich listed Chun-Li as one of 15 "kick-ass" women in video games, asserting that she is "proof that ladies could quite literally kick ass as well as the dudes," while GamesRadar+'s Chris Hoffman included her thighs among Capcom's greatest contributions to gaming history.

See also
 List of Street Fighter characters

Notes

References

External links

 (Street Fighter V)

Capcom protagonists
Characters designed by Akira Yasuda
Female characters in anime and manga
Female characters in video games
Fictional Chinese people in video games
Fictional female martial artists
Fictional characters with post-traumatic stress disorder
Fictional Hong Kong people
Fictional Interpol officials
Fictional martial artists in video games
Fictional police officers in video games
Fictional reporters
Fictional Shaolin kung fu practitioners
Fictional tai chi practitioners
Woman soldier and warrior characters in video games
Fictional wushu practitioners
Video game characters introduced in 1991
Video game mascots
Street Fighter characters